Cophomantini is a tribe of frogs in the subfamily Hylinae of the family Hylidae, the true treefrogs.

It contains the following genera:

 Aplastodiscus Lutz, 1950 – canebrake treefrogs (16 species)
 Boana Gray, 1825 – gladiator treefrogs (99 species)
 Bokermannohyla Faivovich, Haddad, Garcia, Frost, Campbell & Wheeler, 2005 (30 species)
 Hyloscirtus Peters, 1882 (40 species)
 Myersiohyla Faivovich, Haddad, Garcia, Frost, Campbel & Wheeler, 2005 (6 species)
 Nesorohyla Pinheiro, Kok, Noonan, Means, Haddad & Faivovich, 2018 (1 species)
 "Hyla" nicefori (Barbour & Dunn, 1921)

References 

Hylinae
Vertebrate tribes